Catholic Nerds is a Catholic podcast created by author Scott L. Smith, Jr., the husband and wife team of Cody Reed and Mary Reed, and Colby Allen.

Description 
The Catholic Nerds Podcast is described by the creators, as follows: Join the Catholic Nerds Podcast for quality Catholic nerdery. The Catholic Nerds basically nerd out on comics, movies, video games, and books, all from a Catholic perspective, plus a hefty helping of all things Catholic. There will be plenty of Jesus, Mary, and the Eucharist here!

History 
The Catholic Nerds Podcast has interviewed Abby Johnson and her husband Doug Johnson; Cal Dodd, the voice of Wolverine (character) on X-Men: The Animated Series; and other Catholic personalities. 

On Episode 5, the Catholic Nerds interviewed Zac Mabry, who played "Porky" in the 1994 film The Little Rascals, about his conversion to Catholicism.

References

External links 
 
 Catholic Nerds on Google Podcasts
 Catholic Nerds on Breaker
 Catholic Nerds on Apple Podcasts
 Catholic Nerds on Spotify
 Catholic Nerds on Radio Public

Audio podcasts
2019 podcast debuts